The history of post-confederation Canada began on July 1, 1867, when the British North American colonies of Canada, New Brunswick, and Nova Scotia were united to form a single Dominion within the British Empire. Upon Confederation, the United Province of Canada was immediately split into the provinces of Ontario and Quebec. The colonies of Prince Edward Island and British Columbia joined shortly after, and Canada acquired the vast expanse of the continent controlled by the Hudson's Bay Company, which was eventually divided into new territories and provinces. Canada evolved into a fully sovereign state by 1982.

Before being part of British North America, the constituents of Canada consisted of the former colonies of Canada and Acadia from within New France which had been ceded to Great Britain in 1763 as part of the Treaty of Paris. French Canadian nationality was maintained as one of the "two founding nations" and legally through the Quebec Act which ensured the maintenance of the Canadian French language, Catholic religion, and French civil law within Canada, a fact which remains true today.

Canada today has ten provinces and three territories; it only lost significant territory in the border dispute over Labrador with the Dominion of Newfoundland, which later joined Canada as the 10th province.

Timeline

See also

Former colonies and territories in Canada
List of areas disputed by Canada and the United States
List of Hudson's Bay Company trading posts
List of French forts in North America
List of proposed provinces and territories of Canada
Territorial claims in the Arctic
Territorial evolution of North America since 1763

Notes

References

Further reading

External links

Maps: 1667-1999 - Library and Archives Canada
Territorial Evolution, 1670-2001 - Historical Atlas of Canada

Provinces and territories of Canada
Territorial evolution by country
Canadian timelines
History of the Northwest Territories
Districts of the Northwest Territories
Timelines of North American history
Borders of Canada
Annexation